Huzurkent is a town in Mersin Province, Turkey.

Geography 

The town has a  sandy beach at the coast. It is planned to create a Touristic center in this beach. It is on the highway connecting Mersin to Tarsus. The population of the town was 12,553 as of 2007.

History 

The town was founded in 1969  by merging three villages which were almost ruined by the big flood disaster of 1968. The town quickly flourished as the main town and municipality in the vicinity of industrial estates between Mersin and Tarsus. But in 2008 by the act of 5216, administrative status of Huzurkent was changed, the municipality was abolished and the town was incorporated into Greater Mersin proper.

Economy 
Huzurkent is one of the affluent towns of Mersin Province. Situated in a fertile plain, main products are fresh fruits and vegetables. Annual harvest festivals are held in the springs. Some residents also work in the nearby factories.

References 

Towns in Turkey
Populated places in Mersin Province